Vasily Sergeyevich Lanskoy (1754–1831) was a Russian statesman, politician, and Minister of the Interior from August 29 of 1823 to April 19 of 1828.

1754 births
1831 deaths
Senators of the Russian Empire
Russian people of the Kościuszko Uprising